Protein farnesyltransferase subunit beta is an enzyme that in humans is encoded by the FNTB gene.

References

Further reading

External links